Thorpe Cloud railway station was opened in 1899 between the villages of Thorpe and Fenny Bentley in Derbyshire, south east of Buxton.

History

In common with the other stations on this line, the platforms and buildings were of timber construction. From Parsley Hay to Ashbourne the line was single with passing loops at the stations, though provision was made for doubling which never occurred. Like the previous station at Tissington it was built on a gradient of 1 in 60, downwards towards Ashbourne, and the modular buildings were stepped to accommodate this.
The station took its name from a nearby hill, Thorpe Cloud which is at the entrance to Dovedale, and was therefore a popular venue for ramblers. The station was host to a LMS caravan from 1934 to 1939, a camping coach was also positioned here by the London Midland Region from 1954 to 1955.

Regular passenger services ended on 1 November 1954, though excursions continued until 1963. Freight continued until 7 October 1963. The track to Ashbourne finally being lifted in 1964.

The track bed from Ashbourne to Parsley Hay was acquired by Derbyshire County Council and the Peak National Park in 1968 for a cycle and walking route. This, the Tissington Trail, was one of the first of such ventures in the country. Later, Ashbourne Tunnel was acquired by Sustrans.

Route

See also
 Cromford and High Peak Railway

References

Bibliography

External links
Tissington & High Peak Trails - access and facilities
The Pennine Bridleway
 Thorpe Cloud railway station on navigable 1947 Ordnance Survey map

Disused railway stations in Derbyshire
Peak District
Railway stations in Great Britain opened in 1899
Railway stations in Great Britain closed in 1963
Former London and North Western Railway stations